The Daniel L. Herrmann Courthouse is a building in downtown Wilmington, Delaware. Built in 1916, the former courthouse is currently occupied by Young Conaway Stargatt & Taylor, a Wilmington-based law firm.

Description 
The building was built in 1916 to replace an older courthouse. It was designed to accommodate local courts, the administration of the city of Wilmington, and the administration of New Castle County. It was built in the neoclassical style of architecture, typical of courthouse construction in the period, and was used for many years as Wilmington's courthouse as well as by the city and country governments. It was originally named the Public Building, but was renamed the Daniel L. Herrmann Courthouse in 1996 in honor of Delaware Supreme Court Chief Justice Daniel L. Herrmann. In 2002 the building was deemed incapable of meeting its role as a courthouse and once again a new courthouse was built. The City and country governments had moved to a new building several years before. The building was purchased by a credit card company, MBNA, and left vacant. Herrmann's name was removed from the building. Prominent Wilmington law firm Young Conaway Stargatt & Taylor became the building's tenant in 2012 and renovated the building, adding an outdoor plaza and a parking garage.

References 

Wilmington, Delaware
Former federal courthouses in the United States